Eucalyptus pyriformis, commonly known as pear-fruited mallee or Dowerin rose, is a species of low, straggly mallee that is endemic to Western Australia. It has smooth greyish brown bark sometimes with ribbony bark near the base, egg-shaped to lance-shaped adult leaves, flower buds in groups of three, red, pinkish or creamy white flowers and down-turned, conical fruit with prominent ribs.

Description
In nature, it tends to be multi-stemmed but in cultivation it is more likely to be single stemmed. The bark is smooth, grey or salmon-pink coloured, often shedding in ribbons at the base. Flowering occurs between May and October and the flowers are red, pinkish or creamy white flowers.

Taxonomy
Eucalyptus pyriformis was first formally described by the botanist Nicolai Stepanovitch Turczaninow in 1849 in the journal, Bulletin de la Société Impériale des Naturalistes de Moscou. The specific epithet (pyriformis) is a Latin word meaning "pear-shaped".

Distribution and habitat
Pear-fruited mallee grows in flat and gently undulating country between the Murchison River in the north and Dowerin, Goomalling and Cowcowing in the south.

Ecology
The flowers of E. pyriformis provide abundant nectar and pollen as a food source for wildlife.

Conservation status
This eucalypt is classified as "not threatened" by the Western Australian Government Department of Parks and Wildlife.

Use in horticulture
Eucalyptus pyriformis is distinctive for its large, pendulous buds and spectacular coloured flowers. It is sold commercially as tube stock or as seeds and is planted as an ornamental, as a light screen, habitat for birds and insects and as wind protection. It can tolerate drought and light frost, will grow in coastal or inland areas.

See also
 List of Eucalyptus species

References

pyriformis
Myrtales of Australia
Eucalypts of Western Australia
Mallees (habit)
Plants described in 1849
Taxa named by Nikolai Turczaninow